Beating the Game may refer to:
 Beating the Game (1921 Western film)
 Beating the Game (1921 crime film)